Juan Carlos Manuel Aguilar Peña (born 20 November 1998) is a British-born Canadian tennis player of Bolivian descent.

On the junior tour, Aguilar has a career high ranking of 23 achieved on 17 October 2016.

Aguilar won the 2016 US Open boys' doubles title, partnering Felipe Meligeni Alves. In doubles he won the ITF G1 Copa del Cafe in Costa Rica partnering Ulises Blanch and the ITF B1 Campeonato Sudamericano de 18 in Argentina, partnering Bruno Britez. In Singles he won two titles in 2016, ITF G2 Condor de Plata in La Paz, Bolivia and the ITF G2 Canada International Event in Montreal, Canada.

Junior Grand Slam finals

Doubles: 1 (1 title)

ATP Challenger and ITF Futures Finals

Doubles 9 (5–4)

Davis Cup

Participations: (1–1)

   indicates the outcome of the Davis Cup match followed by the score, date, place of event, the zonal classification and its phase, and the court surface.

References

External links
 
 
 

1998 births
Living people
Canadian male tennis players
Bolivian male tennis players
Tennis people from Greater London
Sportspeople from La Paz
Tennis players from Montreal
US Open (tennis) junior champions
Grand Slam (tennis) champions in boys' doubles
Texas A&M Aggies men's tennis players
TCU Horned Frogs men's tennis players
Canadian people of Bolivian descent
Bolivian emigrants to Canada